Dutch Surinamese are Surinamese people of Dutch descent.  

Dutch migrant settlers in search of a better life started arriving in Suriname in the 19th century with the boeroes, poor farmers arriving from the Dutch provinces of Gelderland, Utrecht, and Groningen. Furthermore, the Surinamese ethnic group, the Creoles, persons of mixed African-European ancestry, are partially of Dutch descent.

Many Dutch settlers left Suriname after independence in 1975, which diminished the white Dutch population. Currently there are around 1000 boeroes left in Suriname, and 3000 outside Suriname. Inside Suriname, they work in several sectors of society. Some families still work in the agricultural sector.

See also
 Netherlands–Suriname relations
 Surinamese people in the Netherlands
 Surinamese Dutch

References

Suriname
Suriname
European Surinamese
Ethnic groups in Suriname